Coca-Cola Fiber+ or Coca-Cola plus is a diet variant of the soft drink Coca-Cola with added dietary fiber in the form of dextrin. It was developed by Coca-Cola Asia Pacific and launched locally in Japan during March 2017. The soft drink has been approved by the Japanese FOSHU as a functional beverage and is meant to serve as an option for health-conscious consumers who have varying desires when it comes to beverages, such as sweetened/non-sweetened, more/less caffeinated, or in the case of Coca-Cola Fiber+ more fiber. 

These health claims are disputed as exaggerating the positive effects of consuming dextrin.

Ingredients 
Coca-Cola Fiber+ or "Coca-Cola plus" contains Carbonated Water, Resistant Maltodextrin (dietary fiber), Colour (150d), Acidity Regulator (338, 331), Sweeteners (951, 950, 955), Flavourings, Preservative (211), Caffeine

Production and distribution
Coca-Cola Fiber+ is available in:

Japan
Taiwan 
Mainland China
Hong Kong
Vietnam
Mongolia

References

Coca-Cola brands
Food and drink introduced in 2017
Products introduced in 2017